The French submarine Morse was a  built for the French Navy in the mid-1920s. Laid down in February 1923, it was launched in May 1925 and commissioned in February 1928. On 16 June 1940, Morse, under the command of Jean Georges Charles Paris, struck a mine and sank in the same minefield off the Kerkennah Islands that sank her sister ship  six months later.

Design

Propulsion while surfaced was provided by two  diesel motors and two  electric motors.

Service 
From 1935 to 1937, Morse underwent a thorough overhaul. At the outbreak of World War II, she served in the Mediterranean Sea and was part of the 4th Submarine Flotilla in Bizerte. Morses commander at the time was Captain J.G.C. Paris. In June 1940, Morse was still based in Bizerte. Morse blew up on a mine in the same minefield off the Kerkennah Islands that sank her sister ship Narval six months later.

References

Citations 

World War II submarines of France
Requin-class submarines
Ships sunk by mines
World War II shipwrecks in the Mediterranean Sea